Nodaria cingala is a moth of the family Erebidae first described by Frederic Moore in 1885. It is found in Sri Lanka, Borneo and Sulawesi. N. externalis is described from African countries such as Kenya, Malawi, Mauritius, Somalia, South Africa and Zambia.

Larval food plants include Dalbergia sissoo, Oryza sativa and grasses.

References

Moths of Asia
Moths described in 1885
Herminiinae